Filip Robar Dorin (born 8 September 1940 in Bor) is a Slovenian film director, screenwriter, and film editor.

He studied comparative literature and philosophy at the University of Ljubljana's Faculty of Arts and later screenwriting, directing, cinematography, and film editing at the Columbia College Chicago, from which he graduated in 1969.

Dorin has created some 30 short and medium-length documentary and feature films, as well as twelve full-length films and video portraits of prominent Slovenian poets, writers, musicians, and painters. He has received several Slovenian and international film awards, including the Golden Arena for Best Director at the 1990 Pula Film Festival for his film The Windhunter (Slovenian: Veter v mreži).

References

External links

Filip Robar Dorin biography at Slovenian Film Fund website 

1940 births
Living people
Slovenian film directors
Slovenian screenwriters
Male screenwriters
Golden Arena for Best Director winners
People from Bor, Serbia
Yugoslav film directors
University of Ljubljana alumni
Columbia College Chicago alumni